Route 540 (Route 540) is a  state highway that stretches from Route 50 in Eleele back to Route 50 in Kalaheo on the island of Kauai.

Route description

The road is mainly an alternative to Route 50 and for the first , the Pacific Ocean is in view as the highway travels easterly. Route 540 then takes a sharp turn north at the Kauai Coffee plant, towards Kalaheo. Numerous agriculture fields surround the road.

Major junctions

See also

References

External links

 Route Log for Hawaii Route 540

Transportation in Kauai County, Hawaii
 0540